The 2014 Giro d'Italia Femminile, or 2014 Giro Rosa, was the 25th running of the Giro d'Italia Femminile, the only remaining women's Grand Tour and the most prestigious stage race on the 2014 women's road cycling calendar. It was held over ten stages (nine stages plus a prologue) from 4 July to 13 July 2014, starting in Caserta and finishing in Madonna del Ghisallo.

Last years champion, Mara Abbott, sought to defend her title riding for the UnitedHealthcare team. Five-time winner Fabiana Luperini rode in the race for the 13th time, and plans to retire after the race.

Other highly regarded competitors included; British National Time Trial Champion Emma Pooley, Olympic and World Road Race Champion Marianne Vos, current World Time Trial Champion Ellen van Dijk, Evelyn Stevens, Alena Amialiusik (Astana BePink), Emma Johansson,  Giorgia Bronzini and Linda Villumsen and finally Elisa Longo Borghini (Hitec Products).

Teams
21 teams competed in the race:

 
 
 UnitedHealthcare Pro Cycling
 Alé–Cipollini
 Top Girls Fassa Bortolo
 RusVelo
 
 Vaiano Fondriest
 
 Estado de México–Faren Kuota
 
 
 S.C. Michela Fanini Rox
 Astana BePink
 Servetto Footon
 BTC City Ljubljana
 
 Hitec Products UCK
 Forno d'Asolo–Astute
 Bizkaia–Durango

Stages

Prologue
4 July 2014 – Caserta to Caserta,

Stage 1
5 July 2014 – Santa Maria a Vico to  Santa Maria a Vico,

Stage 2
6 July 2014 – Frattamaggiore to Frattamaggiore,

Stage 3
In the 2014 edition of the race there are a number of stages which contain critical climbs which will favor the races who have General classification ambitions. The first of these notable climbs comes on Stage 3, San Donato Val di Comino is over 4.5 km at an average of 4.7%.
7 July 2014 – Caserta to San Donato Val di Comino,

Stage 4
Approximately 15 km from the finish of Stage 4 riders will face the Torre di Jesi, a climb of 2.3 km in length at an average of over 4.5%.
8 July 2014 – Alba Adriatica to Jesi,

Stage 5
9 July 2014 – Jesi to Cesenatico,

Stage 6
Stage 6 sees one of the most significant climbs of the 2014 edition of the race. The Samede La Crossetta gains almost 700 metres of altitude in approximately 8 km, therefore averaging over 8%.
10 July 2014 – Gaiarine to San Fior,

Stage 7
11 July 2014 – Aprica to Chiavenna,

Stage 8
Stage 8 finishes in the first of two consecutive summit finishes. The San Domenico di Varzo climb is 11 km averaging 8%.
12 July 2014 – Verbania to San Domenico di Varzo,

Stage 9
The second of the two mountain finishes is the climb at Madonna del Ghisallo, a 10 km climb at just over 5%.
13 July 2014 – Trezzo sull'Adda to Madonna del Ghisallo,

Classification leadership

Sub-classifications

Points scales
The following table shows the number of points awarded for the Points and Mountains classifications. With respect to the Mountains classification, the table shows how the points are scaled dependent on the category of the climb.

Time bonuses
Time bonuses of 10, 6, and 4 seconds are awarded to the first three riders across the finish line of each stage (except the prologue). Time bonuses of 3, 2, and 1 seconds are awarded to the first three riders to cross the line of each intermediate sprint.

References

External links
Cycling News

Giro d'Italia Femminile
2014
Giro d'Italia Femminile
Giro d'Italia Femminile